Noah Goldstein is an American record producer, composer, engineer, and mixer, and also works in A&R. He won a Grammy Award for Best Rap Album for his work on Kanye West's My Beautiful Dark Twisted Fantasy, and has been nominated for six others.

Early life
Goldstein was born and raised in Philadelphia. He graduated from Temple University with a master's degree in media studies. After graduating, he did a three-month internship at Greenhouse Studios in Iceland, and then moved to New York. He began working at Electric Lady Studios, where his first session was with Patti Smith.

Career
Goldstein has produced, mixed, and engineered on songs and albums including Arcade Fire's Grammy-winning album The Suburbs, Frank Ocean's album Blonde (which Pitchfork named the best album of the 2010s), the single "FourFiveSeconds" by Rihanna, Kanye West and Paul McCartney, Travis Scott's album Rodeo, Anohni's album Hopelessness, and Pusha T's album Daytona, and for artists including Drake, FKA Twigs, Nas, Jay-Z, RZA, and Bon Iver.

In 2010, he began working regularly with Kanye West and GOOD Music as a producer, mixer, and engineer, on albums including Watch the Throne, My Beautiful Dark Twisted Fantasy, Yeezus, The Life of Pablo, Kids See Ghosts, and Ye. Following his departure from West in 2018, Goldstein was named SVP of A&R at Columbia Records. In 2021, he began production on Rosalía's album Motomami.

Awards

Discography

Production credits

References

External links 
 

Living people
Musicians from Philadelphia
Temple University alumni
American hip hop record producers
GOOD Music artists
Year of birth missing (living people)